"Roller Coaster" is a song by South Korean singer Chungha, serving as the lead single from her second EP, Offset. As of February 2021, the song has close to 70 million views on YouTube, and over 40 million streams on Spotify.

Composition
The electropop song is the lead single of Chungha's Offset EP and incorporates alt-R&B and groovy strings to propel the singer's vocals. The song reflects on the emotions of a relationship, comparing the ups and downs of romance to the title "Roller Coaster" ride. Soompi described it as "a dance song that's reminiscent of '90s style music but with a modern two-step rhythm."

Music video
The music video for "Roller Coaster" bounces between multiple versions of Chungha as a representation of the song's meaning, alternating between a wide-eyed, sweater-wearing innocent to an early 2000s-inspired dancing queen and day-glo hued club dancer.

Accolades

Charts

Weekly charts

Year-end charts

Sales and certifications

Notes

References

2018 songs
2018 singles
Chungha songs
Song recordings produced by Black Eyed Pilseung
MNH Entertainment singles
Korean-language songs